Jonas Gomes de Sousa (born 3 October 1991), simply known as Jonas, is a Brazilian footballer who plays as a defensive midfielder for Bahia.

Club career

Early career
Born in Teresina, Piauí, Jonas started his career at Fluminense-PI, but later represented Cerâmica, as a youth. He subsequently returned to his native state, signing for Piauí in exchange of a motorcycle.

Sampaio Corrêa
In 2012 Jonas moved to cross-town rivals Comercial, appearing with the side in Série D. On 10 December 2012 he joined Sampaio Corrêa, until 2015.

Jonas was a regular starter for Sampaio during the club's promotion campaign to Série B, appearing in 23 matches. He made his debut in the category on 18 April 2014, starting in a 0–2 home loss against Paraná.

Flamengo
Jonas appeared in 30 matches in the season, being announced as the new player of Corinthians on 29 December 2014. However, a deal was not reached with Timão, and he signed a four-year deal with Flamengo on 26 January 2015.

Dinamo Zagreb (loan)
On 16 June 2016, Jonas signed with Dinamo Zagreb on a one-year loan deal, with an option for Dinamo Zagreb to buy.

Coritiba (loan)
On 27 December, he was loaned to Coritiba until the end of 2017 season.

Career statistics

Honours
Coritiba
Campeonato Paranaense: 2017

References

External links

Flamengo profile 

1991 births
Living people
People from Teresina
Brazilian footballers
Association football midfielders
Campeonato Brasileiro Série A players
Campeonato Brasileiro Série B players
Campeonato Brasileiro Série C players
Campeonato Brasileiro Série D players
Saudi Professional League players
Sampaio Corrêa Futebol Clube players
CR Flamengo footballers
Associação Atlética Ponte Preta players
GNK Dinamo Zagreb players
Coritiba Foot Ball Club players
Ittihad FC players
Esporte Clube Bahia players
Expatriate footballers in Croatia
Expatriate footballers in Saudi Arabia
Brazilian expatriate sportspeople in Saudi Arabia
Sportspeople from Piauí